The Rotec Panther is an American ultralight aircraft that was designed and produced by Rotec Engineering, introduced in 1984. The aircraft was supplied as a kit for amateur construction.

Design and development
In its ultralight version the aircraft has a standard empty weight of  when equipped with a lightweight engine and an abbreviated cockpit fairing. It features a strut-braced high-wing, a single-seat, enclosed cockpit, conventional landing gear and a single engine in pusher configuration.

The aircraft is made from aluminum tubing, with the flying surfaces covered in Dacron sailcloth. The cockpit fairing is made from fiberglass. Its  span wing is supported by "V" lift struts and jury struts and features elliptical winglets. The controls are conventional and feature full-span ailerons. The landing gear has bungee suspension and optional main wheel fairings.

Variants
Homebuilt version
Panther with full cockpit fairing and an empty weight that exceeds the maximum for the US ultralight category.
Ultralight version
Panther with small cockpit pod and low sides to save weight. When equipped with the Rotax 277 single cylinder, two-stroke engine of  can qualify for the US ultralight category.
Two seat version
Panther with a second seat in tandem.

Specifications (Panther ultralight)

See also

References

External links
Photo of a Panther

1980s United States ultralight aircraft
Homebuilt aircraft
Single-engined pusher aircraft
Rotec Engineering aircraft